The following radio stations broadcast on AM frequency 1230 kHz: 1230 AM is a regional (Class B) frequency outside the coterminous United States (Alaska, Hawaii, Puerto Rico, and the U.S. Virgin Islands) and a local (Class C) broadcast frequency within the coterminous 48 states.

Argentina
 LT2 in Rosario, Santa Fe.

Bermuda
ZFB

Canada

Mexico
  in Guadalajara, Jalisco
  in Monterrey, Nuevo León
  in Villahermosa, Tabasco

United States

References

Lists of radio stations by frequency